Yoldız is a rural locality (a derevnya) in Yuğarı Oslan District, Tatarstan. The population was 7 as of 2010.

Geography 
Yoldız, Verkhneuslonsky District is located 60 km south of Yuğarı Oslan, district's administrative centre, and 93 km southwest of Qazan, republic's capital, by road.

History 
The village was established in 1923.

Until 1927 was a part of Zöyä Canton; after the creation of districts in Tatar ASSR (Tatarstan) in Tämte (1927–1931), Yuğarı Oslan (1931–1935),  Tämte (1935–1958), Yuğarı Oslan (1958–1963), Yäşel Üzän (1963–1965) and Yuğarı Oslan districts.

References

External links 
 

Rural localities in Verkhneuslonsky District